Mecitözü District is a district of the Çorum Province of Turkey. Its seat is the town of Mecitözü. Its area is 825 km2, and its population is 13,840 (2022).

Composition
There is one municipality in Mecitözü District:
 Mecitözü

There are 54 villages in Mecitözü District:

 Ağcakoyun
 Akpınar
 Alancık
 Alören
 Aşağı Körücek
 Bayındır
 Bekişler
 Beyözü
 Boğazkaya
 Boyacı
 Bükse
 Çayköy
 Çitli
 Dağsaray
 Devletoğlanı
 Doğla
 Elmapınar
 Elvançelebi
 Emirbağı
 Fakıahmet
 Figani
 Fındıklı
 Geykoca
 Gökçebel
 Güngörmez
 Hisarkavak
 İbek
 Işıklı
 Kalecik
 Karacaören
 Karacuma
 Kargı
 Kayı
 Kışlacık
 Konaç
 Köprübaşı
 Körücek
 Köseeyüp
 Koyunağılı
 Kozören
 Kuyucak
 Pınarbaşı
 Sarıhasan
 Sırçalı
 Söğütönü
 Söğütyolu
 Sorkoğlan
 Sülüklü
 Tanrıvermiş
 Terken
 Totali
 Vakıflar
 Yedigöz
 Yeşilova

References

Districts of Çorum Province